Füzes or Fuzes may refer to:

People
Peter Fuzes (born 1947), Australian soccer player

Places
The Hungarian name for two villages in Romania:

Fiziş, a village in Finiș Commune, Bihor County
Stupini, a village in Hida Commune, Sălaj County

See also
 Fuze, in military munitions, the part of the device that initiates function